National Tertiary Route 748, or just Route 748 (or ) is a National Road Route of Costa Rica, located in the Alajuela province.

Description
In Alajuela province the route covers San Carlos canton (Quesada, Florencia, La Palmera districts).

References

Highways in Costa Rica